P.O.K. (from the initial letters of Podosferikes Omades Kedrou, Greek: Ποδοσφαιρικές Ομάδες Κέντρου, English: Central Football Teams) was a coalition, a kind of athletic trust, of the three main football teams of the Attica (the "big three") which lasted until the mid 60's. The term dates to in 1927, when Olympiacos F.C., Panathinaikos F.C. and AEK Athens F.C. withdrew from the Greek Championship after disagreements with the Hellenic Football Federation (HFF), mainly over the championship's financial status. The HFF determined that league's revenues would be equally divided between all teams that participated. Olympiacos, Panathinaikos and AEK did not agree with this, and formed a group called P.O.K. During that season, they played friendly matches with each other.

The name P.O.K. is currently used to allude to the continuing dominance of the three clubs in the National A Division. Rarely does a team outside these three finish in the top three spots of the Championship; doing so is called "breaking the P.O.K.". Since 1928, only three other teams - Aris F.C., Athlitiki Enosi Larissa F.C. and PAOK FC - have won the Greek Championship. Finally, on March 7, 1963, the POK officially ceased to exist. The entry of the teams in the bulletins of PRO-PO, the establishment of the A 'national category and the participation of the Greek teams in the European football cups, made this institution weaken and finally to be abolished.

Establishment
In 1927/28, EEA (Committee of Professional Sports: Greek, Επιτροπή Επαγγελματικού Αθλητισμού) established the first football championship in Greece with teams of the 3 founding football associations: Athens, Piraeus and  Macedonia Football Clubs Association. Before the season had begun, EEA ordered other teams not to play against Olympiacos, as they were punished by the Hellenic Football Federation. Panathinaikos and AEK Athens did not obey and organized friendly matches. This was reportedly  part of a dispute between these three clubs and the league administration for control of the league. As a consequence, the EEA dropped all three clubs on October 31, 1927, and organized the league without them. The teams that took their place were Atromitos from Athens, Ethnikos from Piraeus, and Aris from Thessaloniki.

Activities
The teams that constituted the P.O.K. tried to weaken the EEA, holding their championship with the participation of some other smaller clubs, although the majority of clubs continued under the official administration of EEA.

They also organized various tournaments, during which they invited other foreign football clubs from Yugoslavia, Hungary, Czechoslovakia and Romania, such as Ferencváros, OFK Beograd etc. The three clubs shared the costs of hosting as well as the revenue from tickets sold.

The tournaments organized for the Christmas and Easter holidays were respectively called the Cup and the Easter Cup. They were financially very successful, as the three clubs were supported by the majority of fans in the Athens area. These tournaments continued even after the war when relations with the EEA had again resumed.

The end of conflict
In July 1928 the EEA made the decision to reinstate the three major clubs. However, this decision did not mark the end of the collaboration since the clubs recognized that they had vested interests in each other. Essentially, this continued until the establishment of professional football. Some areas of cooperation were:

 The organization of the Easter and Christmas cups by each one of them in succession with the invitation of foreign clubs until the late 1950s.
 Dissuasion of transfers from one club to another and particularly between Olympiacos and Panathinaikos, even for athletes of other sports, except football.
 Mutual help in the elections for the administration of EEA and the decisions of the Board. The climax occurred in 1976, when the representative of the Olympic committee responsible for the next to vote saved, from demotion, Panathinaikos through bribery of the player I. Hercules, which has become known as the "Case of flowers".

Easter Cup
The first Easter Cup was organized by P.O.K. in 1928 with the participation of the Serbian and Romanian Beogradski benzo corps. It continued, with interruptions, until 1964. Of the 22 total events that took place, one was stopped before completion in 1948. After Olympiacos, who won the cup 10 times, came AEK and Panathinaikos with four wins each. Finally, with one win each, were Ethnikos Piraeus, German team Cologne RT, and Romanian team Progresul București. From 1930 to 1935 there were no events held due to obligations of the top clubs (POK) on the national stage, but the three POK teams continued to play each other in the stadium of Alexandras Avenue during Easter.

Winners:
 1928: Olympiacos
 1929: Olympiacos
 1930-1933: Not held
 1934: Olympiacos
 1936: Olympiacos
 1937: Ethnikos Piraeus
 1938: AEK
 1939: Not Held
 1940: Panathinaikos
 1943: Olympiacos
 1944: AEK
 1945: Olympiacos
 1946: Olympiacos
 1947: Panathinaikos
 1948: Interrupted 
 1949: Olympiacos
 1950: Not Held
 1951: Olympiacos
 1952: Panathinaikos
 1953: Olympiacos
 1954: Panathinaikos
 1955: AEK
 1956: Cologne RT
 1957: Pao
 1958: AEK
 1959: Olympiacos
 1960-1963: Not Held
 1964: Olympiacos

Christmas Cup
The first Christmas Cup took place in 1943 and lasted for two years. Organized with the participation of foreign clubs and the three clubs of P.O.K., this continued with various interruptions until 1962. All in all, there were 17 events held plus one (in 1951) which was stopped before completion. The team with the most wins (eleven) was Olympiacos. The biggest defeat of a Greek team in this tournament took place on December 26, 1959, when Panathinaikos was defeated by Vojvodina with an impressive score of 3-8 at the Alexandra Avenue stadium. Three of the Serbs' eight goals were scored by Toza Veselinovic, who later coached Olympiakos.

Winners:
 1943-44 AEK
 1945-1946: Not Held
 1947: AEK
 1948: Olympiacos
 1949: Panathinaikos
 1950: No Champions
 1951: Interrupted
 1952: Olympiacos
 1953: Olympiacos
 1954: Olympiacos
 1955: Panathinaikos
 1956: Olympiacos
 1957: AEK
 1958: No Champions
 1959: Olympiacos
 1960: Olympiacos
 1961: Olympiacos
 1962: Olympiacos

Sources
 Athlitiki Echo newspaper
 Giannis Diakogiannis, "Football", Kaktos Edition, 1979

References

Football clubs in Attica
Football in Greece